Tedde Moore (born October 28, 1945) is a Canadian actress.

Early life
Tedde Moore is the daughter of Darwina (née Faessler) and actor and educator Mavor Moore, the granddaughter of Canadian theatre figure Dora Mavor Moore, and the great-granddaughter of Scottish-born economist James Mavor.

Career
Moore is best known for playing Miss Shields in the 1983 film A Christmas Story. She reprised her role in the 1994 film My Summer Story and is the only actor to have appeared in both films.

Her film credits include Second Wind (1976),  Murder by Decree (1979), Overnight (1985), Rolling Vengeance (1987) and Down the Road Again (2011).

In 2011, Moore starred as Mrs. Claus in the TV movie Mistletoe Over Manhattan.

Personal life
Moore and her life partner, filmmaker Donald Shebib, have two children — Noah, with whom she was pregnant while filming A Christmas Story and Suzanna — along with Moore's daughter, Zoë, from an earlier relationship with  actor Patrick Christopher Carter. Moore also raised an adopted daughter named Chaunce from the age of three.

Zoë is a writer and Suzanna is a teacher, while Noah, better known as 40, is a music engineer, producer, and a frequent collaborator with the artist Drake.

Moore has five grandchildren.

Health
In 2007, Moore was diagnosed with multiple sclerosis.

Filmography

Film
{| class="wikitable sortable"
|-
! Year
! Title
! Role
! Notes
|-
| 1971 || Rip-Off || Nancy ||
|-
| 1976 || Second Wind || Paula ||
|-
| 1979 || Murder by Decree || Mrs. Lees ||
|-
| 1981 || The Amateur || Newscaster ||
|-
| 1983 || A Christmas Story || Miss Shields ||
|-
| 1985 || Overnight || Leslie ||
|-
|rowspan="3"| 1987 || Rolling Vengeance || Misty's Mother ||
|-
| Taking Care of Terrific || Mrs. Cameron || TV movie
|-
| Mr. Nobody || Narrator || Short film
|-
| 1992 || Terror on Track 9 || Bank Manager || TV movie
|-
| 1994 || My Summer Story || Miss Shields
|-
| 1995 || The Man in the Attic || Another wife || TV movie
|-
|rowspan="3"| 1996 || The Deliverance of Elaine || Mary Ann || TV movie
|-
| Gotti || Judge || TV movie
|-
| Undue Influence || Corrections Officer || TV movie
|-
| 1999 || God's New Plan || Kate Young || TV movie
|-
| 2001 || Focus || Woman #1 in Theater ||
|-
|rowspan="2"| 2002 || Torso: The Evelyn Dick Story || Nurse Gowtand || TV movie
|-
| The Scream Team || Friendly Woman || TV movie
|-
| 2003 || Rolie Polie Olie: The Baby Bot Chase || Polie-Anna || TV movie
|-
|rowspan="2"| 2008 || A Christmas Story Documentary: Road Trip for Ralphie || Herself ||
|-
| The Untold Christmas Story || Herself ||
|-
| 2009 || Clarkworld || Herself ||
|-
|rowspan="2"| 2011 || Down the Road Again || Annie Burns ||
|-
| Mistletoe Over Manhattan || Rebecca Claus || TV movie
|-
| 2012 || The Cast of a Christmas Story: Where Are They Now? || Herself || TV movie
|-
| 2014 || The Anniversary || Evelyn ||
|-
|rowspan="2"| 2017 || High-Rise Rescue || Maxine Smith ||
|-
| Magical Christmas Ornaments || Daisy || TV movie
|}

Television

Awards
In 1976, Moore won Best Supporting Actress for her role as Paula in the film Second Wind at the 27th Canadian Film Awards.

In 1984, Moore was nominated for Best Supporting Actress for her role as Miss Shields in the film A Christmas Story at the 5th Genie Awards, but lost to Jackie Burroughs for The Wars''.

References

External links

Canadian film actresses
Canadian television actresses
Canadian voice actresses
20th-century Canadian actresses
Living people
21st-century Canadian actresses
Actresses from Toronto
Alumni of RADA
Best Supporting Actress Genie and Canadian Screen Award winners
1940s births
Canadian people of Scottish descent
People with multiple sclerosis